Llanllwchaiarn is a community in Ceredigion, Wales, surrounding New Quay and had a population of 848 at the 2011 UK census. It includes the village of Llanwchaiarn.

Communities in Ceredigion